Schechter New York can refer to:

Solomon Schechter School of Manhattan, a K-8 Jewish day school in Manhattan, New York City, United States
Solomon Schechter High School of New York, United States, a co-educational Jewish high school which became Metro Schechter Academy

See also
Schechter v. New York (1935), decision by the Supreme Court of the United States